Hodophobia is an irrational fear, or phobia, of travel. 

Hodophobia should not to be confused with travel aversion.

Acute anxiety provoked by travel can be treated with anti-anxiety medication.  The condition can be treated with exposure therapy, which works better when combined with cognitive behavioral therapy.

Signs and symptoms
People with fear of traveling experience intense, persistent fear or anxiety when they think about traveling and/or during travel.  They will avoid travel if they can, and the fear, anxiety, and avoidance cause significant distress and impair their ability to function.

Related phobias
 Fear of flying
 Driving phobia
 Fear of trains
 Thalassophobia - phobia of sea travel
 Agoraphobia - fear of leaving safe places

Cause
The causes of hodophobia and the mechanisms by which it is maintained are often complex, as with many phobias.

Diagnosis
The diagnosis is clinical.  It is often difficult to determine if the specific phobia of hodophobia should be the primary diagnosis, or if it is a symptom of a generalized anxiety disorder or another anxiety disorder.

Classification
Hodophobia is a specific phobia as classified in the DSM-5.

Management
Acute anxiety caused by travel can be treated with anti-anxiety medication.  The condition can also be treated with exposure therapy which works better when combined with cognitive behavioral therapy.  Relaxation techniques and education can also be helpful in combination with other approaches.

Society and culture
Sigmund Freud, the famous neurologist and the founder of psychoanalysis, confessed in a number of letters that he suffered from fear of travel. He used the term "Reiseangst" for it, which means "travel anxiety" or "fear of travel" in the German language.  However Freud's anxiety was not a "true" phobia.

See also
 Specific phobia
 List of phobias

Other travel-related disorders include:
 Travel sickness in humans
 Transport tetany in animals

References

External links 

Phobias
Travel